William Dyer  may refer to:

 William Dyer (settler) (1609 – c. 1677), early settler of the Colony of Rhode Island and Providence Plantations
 William Dyer (cricketer) (1805–1865), English cricketer of the 1830s
 William John Dyer (1830–1909), New Zealand businessman and politician
 fictional character William Dyer, the narrator of H. P. Lovecraft's novella At the Mountains of Madness
 William J. Dyer (1881–1933), American actor
 William A. Dyer (1903–1993), American journalist
 Bill Dyer (Australian footballer) (1917–1957), Australian rules footballer 
 William G. Dyer (1925–1997), American educator
 Willie Dyer (born 1987), Scottish footballer
 William Dyer (died 1681), 1st Dyer Baronet of Tottenham from 1678–1681
 Bill Dyer (20th century), American broadcaster at two Major League Baseball All-Star Games

See also
Dyer (surname)